The men's 40 km madison competition at the 2002 Asian Games was held on 8 October at the Geumjeong Velodrome.

Schedule
All times are Korea Standard Time (UTC+09:00)

Results
Legend
DNF — Did not finish
DNS — Did not start

References

External links 
Results

Track Men Madison